Shaabiat Al Cartoon (Arabic: شعبية الكرتون) is an Emirati animated comedy series and sitcom that revolves around social and cultural values in Emirati society. It was broadcast on television for the first time in 2006 during Ramadan on the channel Sama Dubai. The show was directed by Amer Kokh from 2006 to 2010, then Haidar Mohammed began directing in 2011.

Shaabiat Al Cartoon originally began as a mobile phone animation service in November 11, 2004 and quickly turned into one of the Persian Gulf region’s funniest animations in 2006 during the month of Ramadan. It discusses various social issues series based on a group of Arab families and individuals living in Dubai, their lives and traditions in a very humorous and engaging way.

Shaabiat "شعبية" in Emirati Arabic refers to a rural neighborhood, just like the setting of the show. Based on a group of Arab families and individuals living in Dubai, the series portrays their lives and traditions in a humorous and engaging way. With 24 unique characters (the most popular being Shambeeh "شامبيه", Affari "عفاري", Atooga "عتوقة" and Bu Mhayer "بو مهير") from local and WANA origin, each with their own unique accent and habits, the animated series has attracted an increasingly loyal fan following across the Arab World. Conceived by Haidar Mohammed, the series has been a great revenue spinner over 5 years. It also gained international recognition and generated high levels of interest among other markets in Arab states of the Persian Gulf, keen on enjoying the Middle Eastern and Emirati culture while gaining a better understanding of the same.

The English language version (with English subtitles) is already underway, catering to a larger global audience. Officially by its production company Fanar Production, established in 2008 (Qanawat from 2006 to 2010), and sponsored by Etisalat, Shaabiat Al Cartoon is a wonderful showcase of social lives and cultural values.

The show had undergone several changes from 2D to 3D and vice versa, and currently it’s 2D.

The show has been compared to The Simpsons and South Park.

Seasons 
 Season 1 (2006)
 Season 2 (2007)
 Season 3 (2008)
 Season 4 (2009)
 Season 5 (2010)
 Season 6 (2011)
 Season 7 (2012)
 Season 8 (2013)
 Season 9 (2014)
 Season 10 (2015)
 Season 11 (2016)
 Season 12 (2017)
 Season 13 (2019)
 Season 14 (2020)
 Season 15 (2021)
 Season 15 (2021)
 Season 16 (2022)
 Season 17 (2023)

References

External links 

  - The official website for the animated series.

Emirati comedy television series
Emirati animated television series
Emirati television sitcoms
2006 Emirati television series debuts
2000s Emirati television series
2000s animated television series